Galvano Fiamma (1283–1344) was an Italian Dominican and chronicler of Milan. He appears to have been the first European in the Mediterranean area to describe the New World. His numerous historical writings include the Chronica Galvagnana, the Chronicon extravagans de antiquitatibus Mediolani, the Chronicon maius, and the Manipolus florum seu Historia Mediolanensis; he is also known for a map of Milan c. 1330.

Biography 
Fiamma was born in 1283 to a family of notaries in Milan. At a young age, he joined the Dominican monastery of Saint Eustorgio.

Fiamma was chaplain to the Milanese lord Giovanni Visconti. He died in Milan in 1344.

Writings 

He wrote several chronicles dealing with the history of Milan and exalting the Visconti, who by his day had in effect become its ruling dynasty.

His book, Cronica universalis, written sometime between 1339 and 1345, includes a passage in which he describes Iceland, Greenland, and Markland:

Until 2021, when this passage was discovered, there had been no evidence that anyone outside Northern Europe had heard of America before Columbus’s voyage in 1492. Paolo Chiesa, a professor of Medieval Latin Literature at Milan University, believes these accounts of the New World likely came from seafarers in the port city of Genoa.

Also in the Cronica universalis, Galvano claims the Vivaldi Brothers reached Ethiopia.

References

Sources
This article originated as a translation of this version of its counterpart in the Italian Wikipedia.

External links 
 

1283 births
1344 deaths
Writers from Milan
14th-century Italian historians
Italian chroniclers
Italian Dominicans
History of Milan
14th-century Italian Christian monks